E. commutata may refer to:

 Echinochloa commutata, a wild grass
 Elaeagnus commutata, an ornamental plant
 Eulimella commutata, a sea snail
 Euphorbia commutata, a flowering plant